Bizarre World is the follow-up to the successful Bizarre Foods. The show encompasses not only the classic bizarre foods of the world but also the unique cultures of the world.  The new show appears to have been dropped in favor of new episodes of Bizarre Foods, which began in April 2010.  The official website link redirects to the Bizarre Foods page on the Travel Channel website.

References

External links
Andrew Zimmern's webpage
Bizarre World at the Travel Channel
Interview With Andrew Zimmern: Travels in a ‘Bizarre World’

2009 American television series debuts
English-language television shows
Food travelogue television series
Travel Channel original programming